Rimpa Siva (born 1986) is an Indian musician known for being one of the few female tabla players. She was taught to play the Farukhabad gharana style by her father, Prof. Swapan Siva. She was the subject of the 1999 French documentary film Rimpa Siva: Princess of Tabla.

References

External links

1986 births
Living people
Tabla players
21st-century drummers